Hawkshaw is a pair of semi-detached houses on the River Tweed, two miles southwest of Tweedsmuir in the Scottish Borders. Historically part of Peeblesshire, the original village of Hawkshaw was destroyed when the Fruid Reservoir was constructed in 1963, and is remembered as the ancestral family home of the Porteous family, dating from at least 1439.

A fortified tower stood on a hill overlooking the village for hundreds of years, although little remains of it now, its site being marked with a cairn built from stones from the original tower; this was probably one of a series of so-called Peel towers, small fortified keeps built along the Scottish Borders, intended as watch towers where signal fires could be lit to warn of approaching danger. A line of these towers was built in the 1430s across the Tweed valley from Berwick to its source (a few miles from Hawkshaw) as a response to the dangers of invasion from the English Borders. Hawkshaw was one of over two dozen of these in Peeblesshire alone.

Roman artefacts have also been found in the vicinity, pre-dating the tower and indicating continuity of habitation in the area for some hundreds of years.

The cairn plays host to a gathering of Porteous family members from all over the world every five years. The September 2005 gathering attracted seventy family members from five continents, and a short religious service was followed by the laying of a wreath at the cairn, in memory of all fallen Porteous servicemen and women.

See also
List of places in the Scottish Borders
List of places in Scotland
Biggar Museum Trust

External links 
CANMORE/RCAHMS record for Hawkshaw, Celtic Head, Stone, Roman
RCAHMS record for Hawkshaw
RCAHMS record for Hawkshaw Castle
RCAHMS record for Hawkshaw, Access Bridge
Cambridge University course, A History of Roman Britain
Ancient Stones:Stone Circle, Hawkshaw, Tweedsmuir
Roman Scotland: Hawkshaw Head
British History Online: Tweedsmuir, Hawkshaw
Photographs of Hawkshaw and Tweedsmuir, about 1934

History of the Scottish Borders
River Tweed
Peel towers in the Scottish Borders
Former populated places in Scotland
Villages in the Scottish Borders
Buildings and structures in the Scottish Borders